This is a list of events that have caused a measurable drop in the total human population. The list covers the name of the event, location and the start and end of each event. Some events may belong in more than one category. In addition, some of the listed events overlap each other, and in some cases the death toll from a smaller event is included in the one for the larger event or time period of which it was part.

There is often large uncertainty about the death tolls. The tables are initially sorted by the geometric mean, meaning the square root of the product of the lowest and highest estimate, of the cumulative number of deaths, for example,  for a lowest estimate of 500 and highest of 2000 dead since the start of the war or disaster.

War

Wars and armed conflicts 

This section lists all wars and major conflicts in which the highest estimated casualties exceeds 100,000. This includes deaths of both soldiers, civilians, etc. from causes both directly and indirectly caused by the war, which includes combat, disease, famine, massacres, suicide, and genocide.

Mistreatment of civilians during war 
This section lists non-combatant deaths during wars that were purposefully committed or caused by military or quasi-military forces with the intent of harm (deaths due to wartime shortages, for example, are not included as they are a side effect of war). They may not particularly target ethnic, religious, or political groups but are usually part of a military strategy that disregards civilian lives, or they may be arbitrary acts of cruelty. See democide.

Political repression

Abuse of workers, forced laborers and slaves 
This section lists deaths caused by poor labor conditions, executions for not performing labor satisfactorily, and deaths caused by mistreatment of the workforce both in transit and at work locations.

Genocides, ethnic cleansing, religious persecution 

This section lists events that entail the mass murder (or death caused by the forced eviction) of individuals on the basis of race, religion, or ethnicity.

Political leaders and regimes 
This section lists deaths attributed to certain political leaders, deaths are from both the conditions within the country due to national policy, and active killings by forces loyal to the leader in question.

Political purges 
This section lists events that entail the mass killings of political opposition (such as those of certain ideology, class or political persuasion).

See also: Red Terror (disambiguation), White Terror, and Politicide.

Prisons, concentration and extermination camps 
This section lists deaths that occurred in particular prisons, concentration and/or extermination camps, deaths are from both the conditions within the camps and from the active murder/execution of prisoners.

Riots and political unrest 

Riots and incidents where at least 100 people died are listed here.

Anthropogenically exacerbated disasters

Disease and famine 

This section includes famines and disease outbreaks that were caused or exacerbated by human action.

Note: Some of these famines and diseases were partially caused by nature.

Floods and landslides 

These are floods and landslides that have been partially caused by humans, for example by failure of dams, levees, seawalls or retaining walls.

Other

Human sacrifice and suicide 
This section lists deaths from the practice of human sacrifice or suicide.

See also

Other lists organized by death toll
See Lists of death tolls

Other lists with similar topics
 List of unusual deaths
 List of accidents and incidents involving commercial aircraft
 Lists of battles
 Lists of disasters
 Lists of earthquakes
 List of epidemics
 List of famines
 List of fires
 List of invasions
 List of events named massacres
 List of tropical cyclone records
 List of riots
 List of terrorist incidents
 List of wars
 Lists of rail accidents

Topics dealing with similar themes
 Anti-communist mass killings
 Casualties of the Iraq War
 Decommunization
 Democide
 Famine
 Genocide
 Genocides in history (before World War I)
 Infectious disease
 Mass killings under communist regimes
 Mass murder
 List of battles by casualties
 United States military casualties of war

References

Footnotes

Citations

Works cited

External links
 
 Soviet Prisoners of War: Forgotten Nazi Victims of World War II
  on AirDisaster.com

Lists of disasters
Lists by death toll
Population